Ivan Averill Cooper (5 January 1944 – 26 June 2019) was an Irish politician from Northern Ireland. He was a member of the Parliament of Northern Ireland and a founding member of the SDLP. He is best known for leading the anti-internment march on 30 January 1972 that developed into the Bloody Sunday massacre in Derry, Northern Ireland.

Early years
Cooper was born to a working-class Protestant family in Killaloo, County Londonderry, and later moved to the "Bogside" area of Derry city. He was briefly a member of the Claudy Young Unionist Association until April 1965 when he joined the Northern Ireland Labour Party. As the Labour candidate in the Stormont general election that year, he attracted a moderate amount of cross-community support, but was not elected. Committed to non-violence, he became a major figure in the Northern Ireland Civil Rights Association, which campaigned for equality during the late 1960s. In 1968, Cooper resigned from the Labour Party and founded the Derry Citizens' Action Committee (DCAC), serving as its president until the following year. In the summer of 1968, at a protest meeting in the Guildhall foyer, he suggested that Catholics and Protestants alike should fight for their rights "as the blacks in America were fighting".

Attempting to rise above sectarian politics, he remained hopeful that both Catholics and Protestants could work together, particularly the working classes of both groups, who he believed shared the same greater interests. His nationalist stance, however, led many fellow Protestants to view him as a traitor. Cooper nonetheless remained loyal to the Anglican Church of Ireland.

Civil rights campaign
Cooper continued his civil rights campaigning, ignoring a month-long ban imposed on marches in Derry in November 1968 by organising a march two days later with the DCAC in which up to 15,000 people took part. Following violence resulting from numerous illegal marches in the city, Cooper called for a halt to spontaneous marches. After escalation of street disturbances at the start of the year, following a march by the People's Democracy movement, which resulted in residents of the Bogside cordoning off areas with impromptu barricades, Cooper managed to persuade locals to remove the barricades. The damage seemed irreparable, however, after a march in Newry got out of control. Most Protestants and many Catholics who had remained supportive of the civil rights actions now withdrew their support.

Parliament
In the 1969 general election, Cooper was elected as an independent member of the Parliament of Northern Ireland for Mid-Londonderry, defeating the sitting Nationalist Party MP, Paddy Gormley.

On 12 August – the start of the few intense days of violence which have become known as the Battle of the Bogside – Cooper tried to restrain Catholics protesting an Apprentice Boys of Derry parade by linking arms with John Hume and Eddie McAteer. However, they were swept aside and Cooper was knocked unconscious by a brick.

Cooper was suspended from Stormont for a week on 20 March after a protest in the Chamber over a Public Order Bill.

SDLP
On 21 August 1970, Cooper co-founded the Social Democratic and Labour Party (SDLP) with Hume, Paddy Devlin, Austin Currie, Paddy O’Hanlon and Gerry Fitt.

Cooper organised a civil rights and anti-internment march for 30 January 1972, which was to develop into Bloody Sunday, whereupon fourteen unarmed civilians were murdered by soldiers from the Parachute Regiment on duty in Derry, who opened fire on the crowd.

After the prorogation of the Stormont Parliament, Cooper was elected as one of the representatives of Mid Ulster to the Northern Ireland Assembly, 1973 and the Northern Ireland Constitutional Convention in 1975. He was also the SDLP's candidate in the constituency in both the February 1974 and October 1974 Westminster elections. By standing in the first of these, he split the nationalist vote and in effect ensured the defeat of independent MP Bernadette McAliskey.

In 1983, Cooper stood aside after the boundary changes for the new Foyle constituency to let his colleague and friend John Hume contest the seat. The increase in levels of violence intertwined with the politics made Cooper slowly move away from politics. He was later an insolvency consultant.

Legacy
At the height of his political career, Ivan Cooper commanded the largest support of any nationalist Stormont MP. A film was released in 2002, called Bloody Sunday, in which Cooper is portrayed by actor James Nesbitt.

He was the husband of Frances Cooper, and had two daughters; Sinead and Bronagh Cooper.

References

1944 births
2019 deaths
Members of the Northern Ireland Constitutional Convention
Members of the House of Commons of Northern Ireland 1969–1973
Members of the Northern Ireland Assembly 1973–1974
Socialists from Northern Ireland
Politicians from County Londonderry
Protestant Irish nationalists
Social Democratic and Labour Party members of the House of Commons of Northern Ireland
Members of the House of Commons of Northern Ireland for County Londonderry constituencies
Junior ministers of the 1974 Northern Ireland Assembly